Tobias Hafstad (born 1 June 2002) is a Norwegian football forward who plays for Tromsø IL.

The son of former Tromsø player Thomas Hafstad, Tobias Hafstad grew up in the club Tromsø IL. He was signed on a professional contract in January 2020. He was also a youth international on U17, U18 and U19 level.

Losing the start of the 2020 1. divisjon with mononucleosis, Hafstad made his debut for Tromsø in August 2020. In the 5–0 victory against Sandnes Ulf, Hafstad registered one assist.

In 2021 he was loaned out to Arendal most of the season. He later returned on a short-term loan in the summer of 2022 following an injury to Tord Salte.

References

2002 births
Living people
Sportspeople from Tromsø
Norwegian footballers
Norway youth international footballers
Tromsø IL players
Arendal Fotball players
Norwegian First Division players
Norwegian Second Division players
Eliteserien players
Association football forwards